A switched-mode power supply (switching-mode power supply, switch-mode power supply, switched power supply, SMPS, or switcher) is an electronic power supply that incorporates a switching regulator to convert electrical power efficiently.

Like other power supplies, an SMPS transfers power from a DC or AC source (often mains power, see AC adapter) to DC loads, such as a personal computer, while converting voltage and current characteristics. Unlike a linear power supply, the pass transistor of a switching-mode supply continually switches between low-dissipation, full-on and full-off states, and spends very little time in the high dissipation transitions, which minimizes wasted energy. A hypothetical ideal switched-mode power supply dissipates no power. Voltage regulation is achieved by varying the ratio of on-to-off time (also known as duty cycles). In contrast, a linear power supply regulates the output voltage by continually dissipating power in the pass transistor. The switched-mode power supply's higher electrical efficiency is an important advantage.

Switched-mode power supplies can also be substantially smaller and lighter than a linear supply because the transformer can be much smaller. This is because it operates at a high switching frequency which ranges from several hundred kHz to several MHz in contrast to the 50 or 60 Hz mains frequency. Despite the reduced transformer size, the power supply topology and the requirement for electromagnetic interference (EMI) suppression in commercial designs result in a usually much greater component count and corresponding circuit complexity.

Switching regulators are used as replacements for linear regulators when higher efficiency, smaller size or lighter weight is required. They are, however, more complicated; switching currents can cause electrical noise problems if not carefully suppressed, and simple designs may have a poor power factor.

History
 1836 Induction coils use switches to generate high voltages.
 1910An inductive discharge ignition system invented by Charles F. Kettering and his company Dayton Engineering Laboratories Company (Delco) goes into production for Cadillac. The Kettering ignition system is a mechanically switched version of a fly back boost converter; the transformer is the ignition coil. Variations of this ignition system were used in all non-diesel internal combustion engines until the 1960s when it began to be replaced first by solid-state electronically switched versions, then capacitive discharge ignition systems.
 1926 On 23 June, British inventor Philip Ray Coursey applies for a patent in his country and United States, for his "Electrical Condenser". The patent mentions high frequency welding and furnaces, among other uses.
  Electromechanical relays are used to stabilize the voltage output of generators. See Voltage regulator#Electromechanical regulators.
 c. 1936 Car radios used electromechanical vibrators to transform the 6 V battery supply to a suitable B+ voltage for the vacuum tubes.
 1959 The MOSFET (metal–oxide–semiconductor field-effect transistor) is invented by Mohamed M. Atalla and Dawon Kahng at Bell Labs. The power MOSFET later became the most widely used power device for switching power supplies.
 1959 Transistor oscillation and rectifying converter power supply system  is filed by Joseph E. Murphy and Francis J. Starzec, from General Motors Company
 1960s The Apollo Guidance Computer, developed in the early 1960s by the MIT Instrumentation Laboratory for NASA's ambitious moon missions (1966-1972), incorporated early switched mode power supplies.
 c. 1967 Bob Widlar of Fairchild Semiconductor designs the µA723 IC voltage regulator. One of its applications is as a switched mode regulator.
 1970 Tektronix starts using High-Efficiency Power Supply in its 7000-series oscilloscopes produced from about 1970 to 1995.
 1970 Robert Boschert develops simpler, low cost circuits. By 1977, Boschert Inc. grows to a 650-person company. After a series of mergers, acquisitions, and spin offs (Computer Products, Zytec, Artesyn, Emerson Electric) the company is now part of Advanced Energy.
 1972 HP-35, Hewlett-Packard's first pocket calculator, is introduced with transistor switching power supply for light-emitting diodes, clocks, timing, ROM, and registers.
 1973 Xerox uses switching power supplies in the Alto minicomputer 
 1976 Robert Mammano, a co-founder of Silicon General Semiconductors, develops the first integrated circuit for SMPS control, model SG1524. After a series of mergers and acquisitions (Linfinity, Symetricom, Microsemi), the company is now part of Microchip Technology.
 1977 Apple II is designed with a switching mode power supply. "Rod Holt ... created the switching power supply that allowed us to do a very lightweight computer".
 1980 The HP8662A  synthesized signal generator went with a switched mode power supply.

Explanation
A linear power supply (non-SMPS) uses a linear regulator to provide the desired output voltage by dissipating power in ohmic losses (e.g., in a resistor or in the collector–emitter region of a pass transistor in its active mode). A linear regulator regulates either output voltage or current by dissipating the electric power in the form of heat, and hence its maximum power efficiency is voltage-out/voltage-in since the volt difference is wasted.

In contrast, a SMPS changes output voltage and current by switching ideally lossless storage elements, such as inductors and capacitors, between different electrical configurations. Ideal switching elements (approximated by transistors operated outside of their active mode) have no resistance when "on" and carry no current when "off", and so converters with ideal components would operate with 100% efficiency (i.e., all input power is delivered to the load; no power is wasted as dissipated heat). In reality, these ideal components do not exist, so a switching power supply cannot be 100% efficient, but it is still a significant improvement in efficiency over a linear regulator.

For example, if a DC source, an inductor, a switch, and the corresponding electrical ground are placed in series and the switch is driven by a square wave, the peak-to-peak voltage of the waveform measured across the switch can exceed the input voltage from the DC source. This is because the inductor responds to changes in current by inducing its own voltage to counter the change in current, and this voltage adds to the source voltage while the switch is open. If a diode-and-capacitor combination is placed in parallel to the switch, the peak voltage can be stored in the capacitor, and the capacitor can be used as a DC source with an output voltage greater than the DC voltage driving the circuit. This boost converter acts like a step-up transformer for DC signals. A buck–boost converter works in a similar manner, but yields an output voltage which is opposite in polarity to the input voltage. Other buck circuits exist to boost the average output current with a reduction of voltage.

In a SMPS, the output current flow depends on the input power signal, the storage elements and circuit topologies used, and also on the pattern used (e.g., pulse-width modulation with an adjustable duty cycle) to drive the switching elements. The spectral density of these switching waveforms has energy concentrated at relatively high frequencies. As such, switching transients and ripple introduced onto the output waveforms can be filtered with a small LC filter.

Advantages and disadvantages

The main advantage of the switching power supply is greater efficiency (up to 96%) and lower heat generation than linear regulators because the switching transistor dissipates little power when acting as a switch.

Other advantages include smaller size, and lighter weight from the elimination of heavy and expensive line-frequency transformers. Standby power loss is often much less than transformers.

Disadvantages include greater complexity, the generation of high-amplitude, high-frequency energy that the low-pass filter must block to avoid electromagnetic interference (EMI), a ripple voltage at the switching frequency and its harmonic frequencies.

Very low-cost SMPSs may couple electrical switching noise back onto the mains power line, causing interference with devices connected to the same phase, such as A/V equipment. Non-power-factor-corrected SMPSs also cause harmonic distortion.

SMPS and linear power supply comparison
There are two main types of regulated power supplies available: SMPS and linear. The following table compares linear with switching power supplies in general:

Theory of operation

Input rectifier stage

If the SMPS has an AC input, then the first stage is to convert the input to DC. This is called 'rectification'. An SMPS with a DC input does not require this stage. In some power supplies (mostly computer ATX power supplies), the rectifier circuit can be configured as a voltage doubler by the addition of a switch operated either manually or automatically. This feature permits operation from power sources that are normally at 115 VAC or at 230 VAC. The rectifier produces an unregulated DC voltage which is then sent to a large filter capacitor. The current drawn from the mains supply by this rectifier circuit occurs in short pulses around the AC voltage peaks. These pulses have significant high frequency energy which reduces the power factor. To correct for this, many newer SMPS will use a special power factor correction (PFC) circuit to make the input current follow the sinusoidal shape of the AC input voltage, correcting the power factor.

An SMPS designed for AC input can usually be run from a DC supply, because the DC would pass through the rectifier unchanged. This type of use may be harmful to the rectifier stage, however, as it will only use half of diodes in the rectifier for the full load. This could possibly result in overheating of these components, causing them to fail prematurely. On the other hand, if the power supply has a voltage selector switch, based on the Delon circuit, for 115/230 V (computer ATX power supplies typically are in this category), the selector switch would have to be put in the  position, and the required voltage would be  (230 × √2). The diodes in this type of power supply will handle the DC current just fine because they are rated to handle double the nominal input current when operated in the  mode, due to the operation of the voltage doubler. This is because the doubler, when in operation, uses only half of the bridge rectifier and runs twice as much current through it.

Inverter stage
This section refers to the block marked chopper in the diagram.

The inverter stage converts DC, whether directly from the input or from the rectifier stage described above, to AC by running it through a power oscillator, whose output transformer is very small with few windings, at a frequency of tens or hundreds of kilohertz. The frequency is usually chosen to be above 20 kHz, to make it inaudible to humans. The switching is implemented as a multistage (to achieve high gain) MOSFET amplifier. MOSFETs are a type of transistor with a low on-resistance and a high current-handling capacity.

Voltage converter and output rectifier
If the output is required to be isolated from the input, as is usually the case in mains power supplies, the inverted AC is used to drive the primary winding of a high-frequency transformer. This converts the voltage up or down to the required output level on its secondary winding. The output transformer in the block diagram serves this purpose.

If a DC output is required, the AC output from the transformer is rectified. For output voltages above ten volts or so, ordinary silicon diodes are commonly used. For lower voltages, Schottky diodes are commonly used as the rectifier elements; they have the advantages of faster recovery times than silicon diodes (allowing low-loss operation at higher frequencies) and a lower voltage drop when conducting. For even lower output voltages, MOSFETs may be used as synchronous rectifiers; compared to Schottky diodes, these have even lower conducting state voltage drops.

The rectified output is then smoothed by a filter consisting of inductors and capacitors. For higher switching frequencies, components with lower capacitance and inductance are needed.

Simpler, non-isolated power supplies contain an inductor instead of a transformer. This type includes boost converters, buck converters, and the buck–boost converters. These belong to the simplest class of single input, single output converters which use one inductor and one active switch. The buck converter reduces the input voltage in direct proportion to the ratio of conductive time to the total switching period, called the duty cycle. For example, an ideal buck converter with a 10 V input operating at a 50% duty cycle will produce an average output voltage of 5 V. A feedback control loop is employed to regulate the output voltage by varying the duty cycle to compensate for variations in input voltage. The output voltage of a boost converter is always greater than the input voltage and the buck–boost output voltage is inverted but can be greater than, equal to, or less than the magnitude of its input voltage. There are many variations and extensions to this class of converters but these three form the basis of almost all isolated and non-isolated DC to DC converters. By adding a second inductor the Ćuk and SEPIC converters can be implemented, or, by adding additional active switches, various bridge converters can be realized.

Other types of SMPSs use a capacitor–diode voltage multiplier instead of inductors and transformers. These are mostly used for generating high voltages at low currents (Cockcroft-Walton generator). The low voltage variant is called charge pump.

Regulation

A feedback circuit monitors the output voltage and compares it with a reference voltage. Depending on design and safety requirements, the controller may contain an isolation mechanism (such as an opto-coupler) to isolate it from the DC output. Switching supplies in computers, TVs and VCRs have these opto-couplers to tightly control the output voltage.

Open-loop regulators do not have a feedback circuit. Instead, they rely on feeding a constant voltage to the input of the transformer or inductor, and assume that the output will be correct. Regulated designs compensate for the impedance of the transformer or coil. Monopolar designs also compensate for the magnetic hysteresis of the core.

The feedback circuit needs power to run before it can generate power, so an additional non-switching power-supply for stand-by is added.

Transformer design
Any switched-mode power supply that gets its power from an AC power line (called an "off-line" converter) requires a transformer for galvanic isolation. Some DC-to-DC converters may also include a transformer, although isolation may not be critical in these cases. SMPS transformers run at high frequency. Most of the cost savings (and space savings) in off-line power supplies result from the smaller size of the high frequency transformer compared to the 50/60 Hz transformers formerly used. There are additional design tradeoffs.

The terminal voltage of a transformer is proportional to the product of the core area, magnetic flux, and frequency. By using a much higher frequency, the core area (and so the mass of the core) can be greatly reduced. However, core losses increase at higher frequencies. Cores generally use ferrite material which has a low loss at the high frequencies and high flux densities used. The laminated iron cores of lower-frequency (<400 Hz) transformers would be unacceptably lossy at switching frequencies of a few kilohertz. Also, more energy is lost during transitions of the switching semiconductor at higher frequencies. Furthermore, more attention to the physical layout of the circuit board is required as parasitics become more significant, and the amount of electromagnetic interference will be more pronounced.

Copper loss

At low frequencies (such as the line frequency of 50 or 60 Hz), designers can usually ignore the skin effect.

Switching power supplies must pay more attention to the skin effect because it is a source of power loss. At 500 kHz, the skin depth in copper is about  – a dimension smaller than the typical wires used in a power supply. The effective resistance of conductors increases, because current concentrates near the surface of the conductor and the inner portion carries less current than at low frequencies.

The skin effect is exacerbated by the harmonics present in the high speed pulse-width modulation (PWM) switching waveforms. The appropriate skin depth is not just the depth at the fundamental, but also the skin depths at the harmonics.

In addition to the skin effect, there is also a proximity effect, which is another source of power loss.

Power factor

Simple off-line switched mode power supplies incorporate a simple full-wave rectifier connected to a large energy storing capacitor. Such SMPSs draw current from the AC line in short pulses when the mains instantaneous voltage exceeds the voltage across this capacitor. During the remaining portion of the AC cycle the capacitor provides energy to the power supply.

As a result, the input current of such basic switched mode power supplies has high harmonic content and relatively low power factor. This creates extra load on utility lines, increases heating of building wiring, the utility transformers, and standard AC electric motors, and may cause stability problems in some applications such as in emergency generator systems or aircraft generators. Harmonics can be removed by filtering, but the filters are expensive. Unlike displacement power factor created by linear inductive or capacitive loads, this distortion cannot be corrected by addition of a single linear component. Additional circuits are required to counteract the effect of the brief current pulses. Putting a current regulated boost chopper stage after the off-line rectifier (to charge the storage capacitor) can correct the power factor, but increases the complexity and cost.

In 2001, the European Union put into effect the standard IEC 61000-3-2 to set limits on the harmonics of the AC input current up to the 40th harmonic for equipment above 75 W. The standard defines four classes of equipment depending on its type and current waveform. The most rigorous limits (class D) are established for personal computers, computer monitors, and TV receivers. To comply with these requirements, modern switched-mode power supplies normally include an additional power factor correction (PFC) stage.

Types
Switched-mode power supplies can be classified according to the circuit topology. The most important distinction is between isolated converters and non-isolated ones.

Non-isolated topologies
Non-isolated converters are simplest, with the three basic types using a single inductor for energy storage. In the voltage relation column, D is the duty cycle of the converter, and can vary from 0 to 1. The input voltage (V1) is assumed to be greater than zero; if it is negative, for consistency, negate the output voltage (V2).

When equipment is human-accessible, voltage limits of ≤ 30 V (r.m.s.) AC or ≤ 42.4 V peak or ≤ 60 V DC and power limits of 250 VA apply for safety certification (UL, CSA, VDE approval).

The buck, boost, and buck–boost topologies are all strongly related. Input, output and ground come together at one point. One of the three passes through an inductor on the way, while the other two pass through switches. One of the two switches must be active (e.g., a transistor), while the other can be a diode. Sometimes, the topology can be changed simply by re-labeling the connections. A 12 V input, 5 V output buck converter can be converted to a 7 V input, −5 V output buck–boost by grounding the output and taking the output from the ground pin.

Likewise, SEPIC and Zeta converters are both minor rearrangements of the Ćuk converter.

The neutral point clamped (NPC) topology is used in power supplies and active filters and is mentioned here for completeness.

Switchers become less efficient as duty cycles become extremely short. For large voltage changes, a transformer (isolated) topology may be better.

Isolated topologies
All isolated topologies include a transformer, and thus can produce an output of higher or lower voltage than the input by adjusting the turns ratio.  For some topologies, multiple windings can be placed on the transformer to produce multiple output voltages. Some converters use the transformer for energy storage, while others use a separate inductor.

 Flyback converter logarithmic control loop behavior might be harder to control than other types.
 The forward converter has several variants, varying in how the transformer is "reset" to zero magnetic flux every cycle.
Chopper controller:
The output voltage is coupled to the input thus very tightly controlled

Quasi-resonant zero-current/zero-voltage switch

In a quasi-resonant zero-current/zero-voltage switch (ZCS/ZVS) "each switch cycle delivers a quantized 'packet' of energy to the converter output, and switch turn-on and turn-off occurs at zero current and voltage, resulting in an essentially lossless switch." Quasi-resonant switching, also known as valley switching, reduces EMI in the power supply by two methods:
 By switching the bipolar switch when the voltage is at a minimum (in the valley) to minimize the hard switching effect that causes EMI.
 By switching when a valley is detected, rather than at a fixed frequency, introduces a natural frequency jitter that spreads the RF emissions spectrum and reduces overall EMI.

Efficiency and EMI
Higher input voltage and synchronous rectification mode makes the conversion process more efficient. The power consumption of the controller also has to be taken into account. Higher switching frequency allows component sizes to be shrunk, but can produce more RFI. A resonant forward converter produces the lowest EMI of any SMPS approach because it uses a soft-switching resonant waveform compared with conventional hard switching.

Failure modes
For failure in switching components, circuit board and so on read the failure modes of electronics article.

Power supplies which use capacitors suffering from the capacitor plague may experience premature failure when the capacitance drops to 4% of the original value. This usually causes the switching semiconductor to fail in a conductive way. That may expose connected loads to the full input volt and current, and precipitate wild oscillations in output.

Failure of the switching transistor is common.

Precautions
Not all power supplies contain a small "bleeder" resistor which slowly discharges the capacitor. Contact with this capacitor can result in a severe electrical shock.

The primary and secondary sides may be connected with a capacitor to reduce EMI and compensate for various capacitive couplings in the converter circuit, where the transformer is one. This may result in electric shock in some cases.

Applications

Switched-mode power supply units (PSUs) in domestic products such as personal computers often have universal inputs, meaning that they can accept power from mains supplies throughout the world, although a manual voltage range switch may be required. Switch-mode power supplies can tolerate a wide range of power frequencies and voltages.

Due to their high volumes mobile phone chargers have always been particularly cost sensitive. The first chargers were linear power supplies, but they quickly moved to the cost effective ringing choke converter (RCC) SMPS topology, when new levels of efficiency were required. Recently, the demand for even lower no-load power requirements in the application has meant that flyback topology is being used more widely; primary side sensing flyback controllers are also helping to cut the bill of materials (BOM) by removing secondary-side sensing components such as optocouplers.

Switched-mode power supplies are used for DC to DC conversion as well. In heavy vehicles that use a nominal  cranking supply, 12 V for accessories may be furnished through a DC/DC switch-mode supply. This has the advantage over tapping the battery at the 12 V position (using half the cells) that the entire 12 V load is evenly divided between all cells of the 24 V battery. In industrial settings such as telecommunications racks, bulk power may be distributed at a low DC voltage (e.g. from a battery back up system) and individual equipment items will have DC/DC switched-mode converters to supply required voltages.

A common use for switched-mode power supplies is an extra-low-voltage source for lighting. For this application, they are often called "electronic transformers".

Terminology
The term switch mode was widely used until Motorola claimed ownership of the trademark SWITCHMODE for products aimed at the switching-mode power supply market and started to enforce their trademark. Switching-mode power supply, switching power supply, and switching regulator refer to this type of power supply.

See also

 Auto transformer
 Boost converter
 Buck converter
 Conducted electromagnetic interference
 DC to DC converter
 Inrush current
 Joule thief
 Leakage inductance
 Resonant converter
 Switching amplifier
 Transformer
 Vibrator (electronic)

Notes

References

Further reading
 
 
 
 
 
 
 
 
 
 
 
  Application Note giving an extensive introduction in Buck, Boost, CUK, Inverter applications. (download as PDF from http://www.linear.com/designtools/app_notes.php)

External links
 
 Switching Power Supply Topologies Poster - Texas Instruments
 Load Power Sources for Peak Efficiency, by James Colotti, published in EDN 1979 October 5
 Notes on the Troubleshooting and Repair of Small Switchmode Power Supplies, by Samuel M. Goldwasser as part of Sci.Electronics.Repair FAQ

Power supplies
Power electronics
Electric power conversion
Voltage regulation